The North Gate of the Royal Pavilion is a Grade II* listed building in Brighton.  It is part of the Valley Gardens conservation area.  Dating from 1832, it is in the Oriental style, as the main Brighton Pavilion, however it was designed by architect and surveyor Joseph Henry Good, not John Nash the architect of the Pavilion and built in the reign of William IV.

References

External links

The Royal Pavilion and Museums' official website
Images of the Royal Pavilion

Grade II* listed buildings in Brighton and Hove
Museums in Brighton and Hove
1832 establishments in England
Indo-Saracenic Revival architecture